Paguristes is a genus of hermit crab in the family Diogenidae. It includes the following species (extinct species are marked with a †):

P. acanthomerus 
P. aciculus 
P. agulhasensis 
P. albimaculatus 
P. alcocki 
P. alegrias 
P. anahuacus 
P. angustithecus 
P. anomalus 
P. antennarius 
P. arostratus 
P. aulacis 
P. aztatlanensis 
P. bakeri 
P. balanophilus 
P. barbatus 
P. barnardi 
P. brachyrostris 
P. brevicornis 
P. brevirostris 
P. cadenati 
P. calvus 
†P. chipolensis  
P. ciliatus 
P. crinitimanus 
†P. cserhatensis  
P. dampierensis 
P. depressus 
P. digitalis 
P. digueti 
P. doederleini 
P. eremita 
P. erythrops 
P. fagei 
P. fecundus 
†P. florae  
P. foresti 
P. frontalis 
P. gamianus 
P. geminatus 
P. gonagrus 
P. grayi 
P. hernancortezi 
†P. hokensis  
P. holguinensis 
†P. hungaricus  
P. incomitatus 
P. inconstans 
P. insularis 
P. jalur 
†P. johnsoni  
P. jousseaumei 
P. kimberleyensis 
P. lapillatus 
P. laticlavus 
P. lauriei 
P. lewinsohni 
P. limonensis 
P. longirostris 
P. longisetosus 
P. lymani 
P. maclaughlinae 
P. macrotrichus 
P. markhami 
P. marocanus 
P. mauritanicus 
P. meloi 
†P. mexicanus  
P. microphthalmus 
P. microps 
P. miyakei 
P. moorei 
P. mundus 
P. oculivolaceus 
†P. oligotuberculatus  
P. ortmanni 
†P. ouachitensis  
P. oxyacanthus 
P. oxyophthalmus 
P. palythophilus 
P. paraguanensis 
P. parvus 
P. pauciparus 
P. perplexus 
P. perrieri 
P. petalodactylus 
P. planatus 
P. praedator 
P. pugil 
P. puncticeps 
P. puniceus 
P. purpureantennatus 
P. pusillus 
P. robustus 
P. rostralis 
P. rubropictus 
P. runyanae 
P. sanguinimanus 
P. sayi 
P. seminudus 
P. sericeus 
P. simplex 
P. sinensis 
P. skoogi 
P. spectabilis 
P. spinipes 
P. squamosus 
P. starki 
P. streaensis 
†P. subequalis  
P. subpilosus 
†P. substriatiformis  
P. sulcatus 
P. syrtensis 
P. tomentosus 
P. tortugae 
P. triangulatus 
P. triangulopsis 
P. triton 
P. turgidus 
P. ulreyi 
P. versus 
P. wassi 
P. weddellii 
P. werdingi 
†P. wheeleri  
†P. whitteni  
P. zebra 
P. zhejiangensis

References

Diogenidae
Taxa named by Henri Milne-Edwards